Fifth Avenue Historic District is a historic neighborhood in Nashville, Tennessee. It was listed on the National Register of Historic Places listings in Davidson County, Tennessee (NRHP) in 1983.

History
The district's homes were built between 1870 and 1930. it is located between Primrose and 20th Avenues and between Magnolia and Belmont Boulevards. The area began with residential homes but following the American Civil War (1870s to the 1890s) a commercial center grew with businesses selling women's clothing and furniture.

The district was added to the National Register of Historic Places listings in Davidson County, Tennessee on May 1, 1980.

Description
The area has been the retail center of Nashville. One of the historic buildings from the district is the Woolworth building. In the 1960s, during the Civil rights movement activists participated in lunch counter sit-ins or Nashville sit-ins, at what was then a Woolworth's Department Store. In 2021 the building came up for lease.

References

1870 establishments in Tennessee
National Register of Historic Places in Nashville, Tennessee
Historic districts on the National Register of Historic Places in Tennessee
Neighborhoods in Nashville, Tennessee
Populated places in Davidson County, Tennessee